Victor J. Menezes (born 14 May 1949) is an Indian banker.

Early life
He was born in Pune, India on 14 May 1947, the son of Manuel Menezes, who was the chairman of the Indian Railway Board. His younger brother Ivan Menezes is CEO of Diageo.

He received his degree in electrical engineering from the Indian Institute of Technology, Bombay in 1970. He received an MBA from the MIT Sloan School of Management in 1972.

Career
In 1972, he joined Citicorp in Corporate Banking. Later, he was posted in "practically every continent" – as one bio-sketch put it. He rose to the post of Chief Financial Officer in 1995. He retired from Citigroup as Senior Vice Chairman after a 32-year global career there.  Currently he chairs the Advisory Board for Citi India. Victor Menezes is Senior Advisor of New Silk Route, an international private equity firm. Menezes Chairs the American India Foundation, is a Vice Chairman of the Asia Society and of Catholic Charities in New York.  He chairs the Executive Committee of the Eisenhower Fellowships. He is a board member of Educational Testing Service and the MIT Corporation and is on the advisory boards of IIT, Indian School of Business (ISB), MIT Sloan and INSEAD. He also has a convention centre named after him at the Indian Institute of Technology Bombay known as the Victor Menezes Convention Centre (VMCC) which was inaugurated by Mr. Kapil Sibal on 8 January 2011.

Menezes was the Chairman of the Clearing House Association; serves as a trustee of the Asia Society, the Eisenhower Fellowships and the American India Foundation. He was named Chairman of the Board of Governors of the National Center for Asia Pacific Economic Cooperation (APEC).  Menezes was a member of Citigroup’s Management Committee and Business Heads Committee.  The IIT Bombay calls Menezes its "product" who reached the highest levels of banking and finance. 

The Securities and Exchange Commission alleges in its complaint that on March 28, 2002, as part of a cashless exercise transaction, Menezes exercised 825,960 Citigroup stock options and sold 597,000 of the resulting shares at a price of $49.99 per share to cover the taxes and costs of the option exercise. As part of the transaction, Menezes retained 228,960 shares. The complaint alleges that, at the time of this transaction, Menezes was in possession of material, nonpublic information regarding Citigroup's plan to report first quarter 2002 losses totaling hundreds of millions of dollars related to the company's Argentine operations, which Menezes supervised. According to the complaint, Menezes was also aware that Citigroup would miss consensus earnings estimates for the quarter.  The final judgment also requires Menezes to pay $1,567,557 of disgorgement, pre-judgment interest of $328,822.77 and a $783,778 civil penalty, for a total payment of $2,680,157.77.

References

1949 births
Living people
IIT Bombay alumni
MIT Sloan School of Management alumni
Indian bankers
Indian Roman Catholics